Annu Tandon (born 15 November 1957) is an Indian politician.  She was an MP in the 15th Lok Sabha from Unnao, Uttar Pradesh with the Indian National Congress party. She left Congress in 2020 to join Samajwadi Party.

Tandon is the founder director of the Hriday Narain Dhawan Charitable Trust, which has been active in philanthropy in the district since before 2000.  The charity, funded mostly through family funds, has worked in education, and gathered attention for innovative projects like helping children of illiterate parents with their homework.

Life and family
Annu Tandon was born on 15 November 1957 in Unnao to Hriday Narain Dhawan and Kripawati Dhawan. She did her Intermediate from Rajkiya Balika Inter College, Unnao in 1975 and received a Bachelor of Science degree from Dayanand Subhash National Post Graduate College, Unnao in 1977. She married Sandeep Tandon on 22 December 1976, with whom she has two sons. Her husband was a liaison executive of Reliance Industries Ltd. Before joining Reliance in 1994, he was with the Indian Revenue Service. As an officer of the Enforcement Directorate, Tandon had investigated foreign front companies floated by Reliance, and also conducted a raid on the house of Tina Ambani.

The entire family has close connections with Mukesh Ambani, two of their sons also being employees of Reliance.

She had declared assets of 41 crores (US$10 mn) in the 2009 election declarations. She declared assets of 42 crores (US$10+ mn) in the 2014 election declarations.

2014 elections
In the Indian general election in Uttar Pradesh, 2014, Annu Tandon was again fielded as a candidate by the Congress.  Unnao is India's largest electoral constituency, and in the previous general elections in 2009, Annu Tandon had won the seat for Congress. Annu Tandon lost the 2014 elections from Uanno badly - she was 4th in the election results barely retaining her deposits at 16% votes. After Congress' resounding defeat in 2014 elections, Annu refused to blame Congress leadership for the debacle.

2009 elections
In the Indian general election in Uttar Pradesh, 2009, Annu Tandon was fielded as a novice political candidate by the Congress.  Unnao is India's largest electoral constituency, and in the previous general elections in 2004, Congress had come up fourth here, and the seat had been won by the Bahujan Samaj Party (BSP). 
During the elections, many prominent personalities including film star Salman Khan campaigned for her.

Samajwadi Party
In October 2020, Tandon resigned from the Indian National Congress party. She joined Samajwadi Party on 2 November 2020.

Career and controversies
She has served as a member on the Committee of Water Resources and that on Empowerment of Women in 2009 when she was part of the 15th Lok Sabha. In the year 2007, MoTech then led by her was under scrutiny for insider trading by regulator SEBI. In 2012, Arvind Kejriwal had alleged Annu Tandon of stashing away black money in Swiss Bank for Relianace with investment banker Praveen Kumar - however, Anu Tandon had denied these allegations.

In February 2015, Annu Tandon's name figured at position 22 (balance $5.7mn) in the list of Indians with accounts in the HSBC Swiss Private bank (Swiss Leaks).

References

1957 births
Living people
India MPs 2009–2014
Women in Uttar Pradesh politics
Indian National Congress politicians from Uttar Pradesh
People from Unnao district
Lok Sabha members from Uttar Pradesh
United Progressive Alliance candidates in the 2014 Indian general election
21st-century Indian women politicians
21st-century Indian politicians